The Part II Bistro Ladies Classic (formerly the Listowel Women's Classic and the Listowel Women's Cash Spiel) is a bonspiel that is part of the women's Ontario Curling Tour. The event is an annual event held in November and takes place at the Wingham Golf and Curling Club in Wingham, Ontario. Prior to 2018 it was held at the Listowel Curling Club in Listowel, Ontario. The first event was held in 2015, and was sponsored by Libro Credit Union. In its latest season in 2019, it was part of the World Curling Tour.

Past champions

References

Ontario Curling Tour events
Recurring sporting events established in 2015
Perth County, Ontario
Women's World Curling Tour events
Huron County, Ontario